Taif Regional Airport  is an airport in Taif, Saudi Arabia. The airport is located 30 km to the east of Taif and 70 km from Mecca. The airport is considered important in Saudi aviation history as it witnessed the first landing of Ibn Saud's plane, founder of the Kingdom. It was converted to a regional airport in 2009 when GACA allowed international airlines to operate at the airport as the city's population was increasing and to reduce pressure on the three main airports at the time. Despite being named as a "Regional" airport, the airport actually has international flights destinations in half a dozen countries outside of Saudi Arabia.

Airlines and destinations

Statistics

See also 

 Saudia
 General Authority of Civil Aviation
 King Abdulaziz International Airport
 List of cities and towns in Saudi Arabia
 As-Sayl As-Saghir
 Miqat of Qarnul-Manazil at As-Sayl Al-Kabir
 Regions of Saudi Arabia

References

External links

Airports in Saudi Arabia
At-Ta'if